Diego José Erroz (born September 21, 1978), is a former Argentine association football midfielder and current coach.

Erroz was born in Berrotarán, Argentina, and currently works as coaching staff for Atlético Tucumán of the Primera B Nacional in Argentina.

Teams
  Rosario Central 1996–2002
  Tiro Federal 2003–2004
  Almagro 2004–2005
  Tiro Federal 2005–2007
  Atlético Tucumán 2007–2011
  Talleres 2011–2012
  Tiro Federal 2012–2013

Titles
  Atlético Tucumán 2007-2008 (Torneo Argentino A)
  Atlético Tucumán 2008-2009 (Primera B Nacional)

References
 Profile at BDFA 

1978 births
Living people
Argentine footballers
Argentine expatriate footballers
Rosario Central footballers
Atlético Tucumán footballers
Tiro Federal footballers
Club Almagro players
Association football midfielders
Atlético Tucumán managers